H. maculatum may refer to:
 Hieracium maculatum, the spotted hawkweed, a flowering plant species found in Europe
 Hypericum maculatum, the imperforate St John's-wort, a plant species native to Europe and Western Asia

See also